Qortimet e vjeshtës (Autumn's Approach) is a 1981 Albanian drama film directed by Kristaq Dhamo and written by Peçi Dado.

Cast
Kastriot Çaushi   
Sulejman Dibra   
Tinka Kurti   
Ndrek Luca   
Prela Ndrek

External links
 

1982 films
1982 drama films
Albanian-language films
Films directed by Kristaq Dhamo
Albanian drama films